The University and State Library Darmstadt ( (ULB)) supplies literature and information for members of the Technische Universität Darmstadt and the population of Darmstadt and southern Hesse. Purposes of the institution include education, research and teaching. , the library has a stock of 4,756,277 publications with an annual circulation of 354,200; ULB has 220,000 visitors and employs a staff of 103.66 FTE. The ULB offers at three locations learning rooms and spaces for over 1000 people. , the City Centre library opened 24 hours per day. Director is Thomas Stäcker.

History
Basis of the library was the book collection of George I, Landgrave of Hesse-Darmstadt in 1567, the year the landgrave moved to Darmstadt. In 1595, the collection comprised  750 works. The  was located in the Residential Palace Darmstadt. The first librarian  took office in 1692. Louis I, Grand Duke of Hesse (1753–1830), with his passion for collecting, promoted the library (1789: 16,000 volumes). During secularization in 1803, libraries of the Benedictines in Seligenstadt, the Dominicans in Wimpfen, the Capuchins in Bensheim and Dieburg and the Carmelites in Hirschhorn were brought to Darmstadt. Substantial was the 1805 addition of the Cologne  (1750–1805) collection. It was the ninth largest library of the German empire in 1902, grown to 564,000 volumes in 1914 and named  in 1920.

After integration into the Technische Universität Darmstadt in 2000, it received its new name in 2004. In 2012, ULB Darmstadt moved to a new building.

Collections
  Collection
 Keyserling estate
 Hitda Codex
 Prayer book of Stephan Lochner
 Gero Codex (UNESCO's Memory of the World Programme)
 Golden Bull of 1356, Cologne edition (UNESCO's Memory of the World Programme)
 Manuscripts by Christoph Graupner

Gallery

Main building
 City Centre, Magdalenenstraße 8, 64289 Darmstadt (ISIL DE-17)

The building was opened on 12 November 2012 and was build by the architecture firm Bär, Stadelmann, Stöcker Architekten BDA.

Branches
Sources:

 , Franziska-Braun-Straße 10, 64287 Darmstadt (ISIL DE-17-2) (opened 27 May 2013)
 Residential Palace Darmstadt, Residenzschloss 1, 64289 Darmstadt (focus on humanities)

See also
 Technische Universität Darmstadt

References

Further reading

External links

  

Darmstadt
Technische Universität Darmstadt
1567 establishments in the Holy Roman Empire
Library buildings completed in 2012
Deposit libraries
Libraries established in 1567